The American Angus is an American breed of beef cattle. It derives from the Scottish Aberdeen Angus population, but may only be black. Red-coated individuals may not be registered with the American Angus Association but can be registered as Red Angus.

History 

In 1883 a breeders' association, the American Aberdeen-Angus Breeders' Association, was established in Chicago, Illinois,  with 60 members; the name was shortened to American Angus Association in the 1950s.

Until 1917 both black and red cattle could be registered in the herd-book of the association; thereafter, red-coated individuals were barred from registration. 

The registered population in 2010 numbered about  head, with almost  breeding cows and over  registered bulls, making it the most numerous beef breed of the United States. In 2021 the conservation status of the breed was reported to DAD-IS as "not at risk".

Use 

The American Angus is a beef breed, and is reared only for that purpose. Comparative trials have not identified any commerciallysignificant difference between it and the Red Angus. Since 1978, beef meeting certain criteria may be marketed as "Certified Angus Beef", a quality mark of the American Angus Association; provenance from purebred American Angus cattle is not a requirement.

Bulls have been used as sires for crossbreeding. The breed has contributed to the creation of various hybrid breeds including the Amerifax.

References 

Cattle breeds
Cattle breeds originating in the United States